JDS Ayase (DE-216) was the second ship of the s of the Japan Maritime Self-Defense Force.

Development and design 
The main anti-submarine (ASW) weapon was changed from the M/50  ASW rocket launcher to the ASROC anti-submarine missile. The octuple launcher for ASROC was stationed at the mid-deck, and the entire ship design was prescribed by this stationing.

Construction and career
Ayase was laid down on 5 December 1969 at Mitsubishi Heavy Industries, Tokyo and launched on 16 September 1970. The vessel was commissioned on 20 May 1971 into the 33rd Escort Corps of the Yokosuka District Force with JDS Akebono.

On March 27, 1982, the 37th Escort Corps was newly formed under the control of the Yokosuka District Force and incorporated with JDS Chitose.

Ayase was transferred to the 33rd Yokosuka District Force Escort Corps on August 1, 1995, and removed from the register on August 1, 1996. She has consistently belonged to the Yokosuka District Force since commissioning, and the total itinerary during commissioning has reached 471,769 nautical miles and more than 20 laps of the earth.

References

1970 ships
Ships built by Mitsubishi Heavy Industries
Chikugo-class destroyer escorts